An affair is a sexual relationship, romantic friendship, or passionate attachment between two people without the attached person's significant other knowing.

Affair may also refer to:
 Foreign affairs,
as in Foreign policy
or Foreign Affairs (publication)
 Internal affairs, as in law enforcement
 Affair (album), a 1988 album by Cherrelle
 Affairs (album), a 1980 album by Elliott Murphy
 Affair (film), a 2010 Indonesian film
 Political affairs, see political scandal

See also 
 The Affair (disambiguation)